This article serves as an index – as complete as possible – of all the honorific orders or similar decorations awarded by Sabah, classified by Monarchies chapter and Republics chapter, and, under each chapter, recipients' countries and the detailed list of recipients.

Awards

MONARCHIES

Governors of Sabah 

 Sakaran Dandai (8th Governor of Sabah  - ) : 
  Grand Master of the Order of Kinabalu
 Ahmadshah Abdullah (9th Governor of Sabah  - ) : 
  Grand Master of the Order of Kinabalu
 Juhar Mahiruddin (10th Governor of Sabah  - present) :
  Companion of the Order of Kinabalu (ASDK)
  Commander of the Order of Kinabalu (PGDK) with title Datuk
  Grand Master and Grand Commander of the Order of Kinabalu (SPDK)  with title Datuk Seri Panglima
 J.P.
 Norlidah Binti Datuk RM Jasni, his wife :
  Member of the Order of Kinabalu (ADK)
  Grand Master and Grand Commander of the Order of Kinabalu (SPDK)  with title Datuk Seri Panglima

 STATES of MALAYSIA

Governors of Malacca 
 Mohd Khalil Yaakob ( 6th Yang di-Pertua Negeri of Malacca since 4 June 2004 ) :
  Grand Commander of the Order of Kinabalu (SPDK)  with title Datuk Seri Panglima

Governors of Penang 

 Abdul Rahman Abbas (Governor of Penang :  - present) :
  Grand Commander of the Order of Kinabalu (SPDK) with title Datuk Seri Panglima

Governors of Sarawak 
 Abang Muhammad Salahuddin ( 3rd & 6th Governor of Sarawak 2 April 1977 – 2 April 1981 & since 22 February 2001 ) :
  Grand Commander of the Order of Kinabalu (SPDK) with title Datuk Seri Panglima

Johor Royal Family 
They have been awarded :

 Ibrahim Ismail of Johor : 
  Grand Commander of the Order of Kinabalu (SPDK)  with title Datuk Seri Panglima

Other Sultanates 
To be completed if any new decorations for :

to be completed

 ASIAN MONARCHIES

To be completed if any ...

 EUROPEAN MONARCHIES

To be completed if any ...

REPUBLICS 

To be completed if any ...

See also 
 Mirror page : List of honours of the Governors of Sabah by country

References 

 
Sabah